The James Dickson House, also known as the Sparks House, is a historic house in Linden, Tennessee, U.S..

History
The house was built , possibly earlier, making it "one of the oldest houses in the county." Dickson was a magistrate for Perry County.

In the postbellum era, the house belonged to the Ledbetter family. When their daughter Minerva married Jessie Sparks, it became associated with the Sparks political family: J. Kent Sparks, their son, served in the Tennessee General Assembly.

The house has been listed on the National Register of Historic Places since March 28, 1985.

References

National Register of Historic Places in Perry County, Tennessee
Houses completed in 1819